Coelogyne radioferens is an orchid endemic to Borneo. Among its genus, it stands out for its cinnamon-colored flowers.

References
The Internet Orchid Species Photo Encyclopedia

radioferens